Cory Lamar Crossgill Burke (born 28 December 1991) is a Jamaican professional footballer who plays as a forward for the New York Red Bulls of Major League Soccer and the Jamaica national team.

Club career

Rivoli United 
Born in Kingston, Jamaica, Burke began his career with schoolboy side Old Harbour High. Between 2013 and 2015, Cory Burke played three seasons for Rivoli United, where he totaled 26 goals and was second in goals in Jamaica's Red Stripe Premier League for the 2015–16 season.

Bethlehem Steel FC 
Burke's performance for Rivoli United sparked interest abroad and on 17 February 2016, he joined the newly formed Bethlehem Steel FC on a year-long loan. After registering 4 goals from 20 appearances during Steel FC's 2016 season, Burke's loan deal was made permanent by official transfer in November 2016.

Philadelphia Union 
After spending two seasons with Philadelphia Union's USL affiliate in Bethlehem, Burke was officially signed to the MLS team on 21 December 2017. Burke made his debut for the Union on 3 March 2018, as a substitute in the home opener against New England Revolution, registering an assist on the Union's second goal. Burke began to establish himself as a regular starter, culminating in being the joint top scorer on the season (alongside Fafa Picault) with 10 goals.

Due to an error in renewing his U.S. visa in May 2019, Burke was unable to play for the Union. At the time, he was also in the process of applying for a green card for permanent residency in the U.S. He officially returned to Philadelphia in October 2020 and made his first appearance in 18 months as a substitute against New England Revolution. Burke scored against the Revolution weeks later as the final goal of the Union's season, resulting in the team's first MLS Supporter's Shield title.

Loans to Portmore and St. Pölten 
On 4 September 2019, Burke was loaned to Portmore United whilst his ongoing visa issue were solved. During his time with Portmore, Burke found consistent scoring form leading the league's scoring with 11 goals (7 goals in 8 matches) midway through the season. Burke finish his time at Portmore with 11 goals in 20 matches.

On 6 February 2020, Burke moved to Austrian Bundesliga side St. Pölten on loan until June 2020 as a result of his visa issues. He scored his first goals for St. Pölten on 2 June, netting a hat-trick against Swarovski Tirol. Burke scored 4 goals from 11 appearances during his loan in Austria.

Return to Philadelphia 
After the resolution of his visa issues Burke's loan with St. Pölten came to an end in July 2020 and he returned to the Union. Burke would see very little playing time in with the Union in 2020, scoring 2 goals in 5 appearances. At the conclusion of the 2020 season, Burke signed a new two-year contract with the Union, with an option for a third year. The 2021 season would see Burke becoming a regular part of the Union roster both as a starter and substitute scoring 4 goals and 2 assists in 19 games. In 2022 Burke would appear in 33 of the Union's 34 regular season game primarily coming on as a sub for striker Mikael Uhre and would score 7 goals and create 5 assists in the regular season. Burke would continue to appear in the Union's playoff run scoring a goal in the Union's 3-1 win over New York City Football Club in the Eastern Conference Final.

On 15 November 2022, the Union announced they were declining Burke's contract option for 2023.

New York Red Bulls 
On 21 November 2022, Burke signed a two-year deal with New York Red Bulls.

International career
In 2016, Burke made his senior team debut versus Haiti and scored his first international goal against Guyana. Burke's second international goal was scored against Suriname in the final group match of the 2017 Caribbean Cup qualification, sending Jamaica to the 2017 Gold Cup. Burke made five appearances during the 2017 Gold Cup, where Jamaica finished runner-up to the United States.

Burke scored four goals for Jamaica during the 2019–20 CONCACAF Nations League qualifying ultimately helping Jamaica earn a spot in League B of the inaugural competition.

During the 2021 CONCACAF Gold Cup, Burke was called up alongside Philadelphia Union teammates Andre Blake and Alvas Powell. He scored an equalizing goal against Guadeloupe during the group stage; marking his seventh national team goal. Making four appearances for the Reggae Boyz during the competition, Jamaica was ultimately knocked out during the quarterfinals against the United States.

Career statistics

Club

International

Scores and results list Jamaica's goal tally first, score column indicates score after each Burke goal.

Honours

Philadelphia Union
Supporters' Shield: 2020

References

External links 

 
 

1991 births
Living people
Jamaican footballers
Jamaica international footballers
Rivoli United F.C. players
Philadelphia Union II players
Philadelphia Union players
Portmore United F.C. players
SKN St. Pölten players
New York Red Bulls players
Association football forwards
National Premier League players
USL Championship players
Major League Soccer players
Sportspeople from Kingston, Jamaica
2017 CONCACAF Gold Cup players
2021 CONCACAF Gold Cup players